Hubert George Perrett (4 September 1922 – 30 June 1989) was an Australian rules footballer who played with South Melbourne in the Victorian Football League (VFL).

Perrett also served in the Australian Army during World War II.

Notes

External links 

George Perrett's playing statistics from The VFA Project

1922 births
1989 deaths
Australian rules footballers from Melbourne
Sydney Swans players
Port Melbourne Football Club players
Australian Army personnel of World War II
Military personnel from Melbourne
People from Albert Park, Victoria